The Maryland Pride was an WPSL club based in Howard County, Maryland. The team changed ownership in mid-season 2007 when the Thunder Soccer Club in Columbia, Maryland took over the team.

The club was originally named the Lady Bays and began play in 1994 when the United Soccer Leagues (USL) organized a pilot season to test the demand for a national women's soccer league. The Lady Bays advanced to the first unofficial national tournament, where they were eliminated by Sacramento, California, the eventual 1994 champion. In 1996, playing as the Pride, the team set a goal of winning the national title. After compiling an 8-1 regular-season record, the Pride rolled to the national title by defeating three opponents by a combined score of 9–0 at the 1996 national championship tournament. Maryland finished an undefeated season in 2001 and won the regular season championship. The Pride have advanced to national playoffs seven times in their 16 years of operation. On January 18, 2011, the team announced that they would not play in 2011 and has been discontinued.

Year-by-year

References

External links

Soccer clubs in Maryland
Women's soccer clubs in the United States
USL W-League (1995–2015) teams
Women's Premier Soccer League teams
Women's sports in Maryland
1994 establishments in Maryland
Association football clubs established in 1994
2011 disestablishments in Maryland
Association football clubs disestablished in 2011